Molo San Vincenzo Lighthouse is an active lighthouse located at the end of the western side to the entrance of the Port of Naples, Campania on the Tyrrhenian Sea.

History
The first lighthouse was built in 1487 under the reign of Ferdinand I of Naples on plan of Luca Bengiamo and was called Torre San Vincenzo, however the lighthouse was damaged in 1495 in the clashes between the Aragonese and the French and rebuilt under Frederick of Naples. In 1624 the lantern was destroyed by fire and the reconstruction, attributed to Pietro De Marino, was completed in 1626.

Description
The tower is characterized by three windows framed in white. The lighthouse is completely automated and is operated by the Marina Militare with the identification code number 2424 E.F.

See also
 List of lighthouses in Italy
 Naples

References

External links

 Servizio Fari Marina Militare

Lighthouses in Italy